The Stade Jean-Bouin was a football stadium in Nîmes, France, which was the home of Nîmes Olympique between 1937 and 1989.

References

Nîmes Olympique
Sports venues completed in 1919
Defunct football venues in France
Sports venues demolished in 1996